The 1963–64 Danish Cup qualifying rounds inaugurated the 10th season for the Danish Cup (DBUs Landspokalturnering). The qualifying rounds of the cup tournament were governed by the six regional football associations, the Bornholm FA, Copenhagen FA, Funen FA, Jutland FA, Lolland-Falster FA and Zealand FA. 671 teams were registered for the qualifying rounds, of which only 44 teams would quality for the proper rounds, under the auspices of the Danish FA's tournament committee, joined by 36 additional teams from the first, second and third divisions in the Danish football league system. The Danish FA dictated that the ticket prices to the qualifying matches should be at least DKK 2 for adults and DKK 1 for children.

Bornholm FA
Only one team from the Bornholm FA (BBU) qualified for a spot in the proper rounds of the cup tournament. The qualifying rounds for the member clubs of Bornholm FA were played in June and July 1963 and were split into two qualification groups known as group A and B, with Rø IF winning the final match of group B qualifying the club to play in the quarterfinals. Teams placed in group A were the teams from the 1963 Bornholm Series and the 1963 Kvalifikationsturneringen, while group B included teams from the sixth and seventh level leagues, the BBUs A-række and BBUs B-række, featured five teams registered to the cup tournament; Gudhjem IF, Rø IF, Østermarie IF, Aarsballe BK and Klemensker IF, excluding any reserve teams in the regional leagues. Rønne IK was the only Bornholm-based club participating in top four national divisions under the auspices of the Danish FA, playing in the 1963 Kvalifikationsturneringen, and entered the cup tournament for the first time in the third qualifying round. Nexø BK won the final regional qualifying match against Rønne IK, securing their place in the main cup tournament, for which they were awarded a new trophy by the chairman of the Bornholm FA and the first lot in the annual regional cup qualifier final. The silver trophy, donated to the Bornholms FA, was financed and sponsored by the local newspaper, Bornholms Tidende, and had to be won three times in a row or five times in total in order for a club to keep it permanently.

First BBU qualifying round
The first qualifying cup match on Bornholm was played on 26 June 1963 between Rø IF of the 1963 BBUs A-række and the only representative for the 1963 BBUs B-række, Klemensker IF. The entire path for the Group B qualifiers was determined before the first match took place.

Second BBU qualifying round
The two matches included the winner from the first qualifying match and the remaining teams signed up from the 1963 BBUs A-række.

Third BBU qualifying round
Four teams from the 1963 Bornholm Series entered the cup tournament for the first time, while Allinge-Sandvig GF received a bye for the next round. It was predetermined that the teams of group A and group B would not play matches against each other until the next round.

Fourth BBU qualifying round
The winner of the group B qualifying path, Rø IF, played against Allinge-Sandvig GF, who entered the regional qualifying rounds for the first time following a bye in the first round.

Fifth BBU qualifying round
A draw held on 15 July 1963 determined the ground for the second match in the fifth qualifying round, also referred to as the regional semi-finals for Bornholm, played on 17 July 1963.

Sixth BBU qualifying round
The sixth qualifying round was also referred to as the regional cup final for Bornholm.

Copenhagen FA
Out of 48 potential cup participants, excluding the clubs competing in the top three divisions, 45 teams in the 1963 season were registered for the qualifying rounds in the Copenhagen area, administrated by the Copenhagen FA, distributed between all 10 teams from the Copenhagen Series (group A), all 12 teams from the KBUs Mellemrække, all 12 teams from the KBUs A-række and 9 of 12 KBUs B-række. Seedings occurred for teams in the regional second highest league, which would have the top placed teams from the 1962 KBUs Mellemrække enter the second qualifying round, while the bottom three teams would enter the first qualifying round. All the clubs in the Copenhagen Series and the two Copenhagen-based teams in the Kvalifikationsturneringen entered the second qualifying round. Over the course of three qualifying rounds and 37 matches, the field would be narrowed down to 8 teams that would enter the First Round Proper.

First KBU qualifying round
The draw for the first qualifying regional was held by Copenhagen FA on 8 May 1963. The bottom three clubs from the final standings of the 1962 KBUs Mellemrække including teams in the lower ranking leagues entered the first round. The matches were played between 22 and 29 May 1963.

Second KBU qualifying round
The draw for the second qualifying regional round was held by Copenhagen FA on 8 May 1963. The matches were played between in May and June 1963. The two Copenhagen FA member clubs from the 1963 Kvalifikationsturneringen and the clubs of the 1963 Copenhagen Series entered the cup tournament for the first time. The top placed teams in the final league standings of the 1962 KBUs Mellemrække entered the second round.

Third KBU qualifying round
The draw for the third qualifying regional round was held by Copenhagen FA on 8 May 1963. All the matches were played in June 1963.

Funen FA
On 1 May 1963, the programme for the five regional qualifying rounds under the auspices of the Funen FA was announced. A total of 106 teams from the Funen regional football leagues including two clubs in the 1963 Kvalifikationsturneringen, playing a total of 99 cup matches to find the seven clubs that would qualify for the main cup competition. The clubs included 13 entrants from the 1963 FBUs Serie 4, 35 entrants from the 1963 FBUs Serie 3, 29 entrants from the 1963 FBUs Serie 2 and 19 entrants from the 1963 FBUs Serie 1, 8 entrants from the 1963 Funen Series and 2 entrants from the 1963 Kvalifikationsturneringen. It was the first season with more than 100 participants in the qualifying rounds. The first qualifying round for the Funen FA member clubs was inaugurated in early May 1963 and the last regional qualifying matches were played in early July.

Geographical considerations were taken into account at the draw for the first round fixtures involving Funen and the surrounding isles. The clubs competing in the 1963 season of the regional top-flight league, Funen Series, were seeded based on the 1962 season's league standings excluding the reserve teams. Hence, Tved BK and Odense-based club Østre BK (both having been promoted from the 1962 FBUs Serie 1), Ringe BK and Fraugde IF (the two lowest placed teams in the 1962 Funen Series) entered the fourth qualifying round, while Assens G&IK and Aarup BK (placed higher in the 1962 Funen Series final league standings), the two relegated teams from the 1962 Kvalifikationsturneringen, Nyborg G&IF and BK Marienlyst including the two Funen-based teams competing in the 1963 Kvalifikationsturneringen, Svendborg fB and Otterup B&IK entered the fifth qualifying round. The teams, that progressed to the proper rounds were Svendborg fB, Assens G&IK, BK Marienlyst and Nyborg G&IF, Næsby G&IF, Middelfart G&BK and Rudkøbing BK.

First FBU qualifying round
In the first qualifying round, a total of 96 teams would play 48 matches, originally scheduled to take place no later than 10 May 1963 (Store Bededag), of which 48 teams would progress to the second qualifying round. The overall score was 279 goals made in 48 matches, a decrease compared to 297 goals made in 44 matches during the first round last season. The fixtures involved clubs participating in the 1963 FBUs Serie 1 and the three lower ranking leagues.

Second FBU qualifying round
The matches in the second qualifying round at Funen were primarily played on 23 May (Feast of the Ascension) with one match on 21 May. The second qualifying round featured 48 teams playing 24 matches with 24 teams qualifying for the third round – 11 clubs from the FBU's Serie 1, 16 clubs from the FBU's Serie 2, 13 clubs from the FBU's Serie 3 and 8 clubs from the FBU's Serie 4. A total of 118 goals against 40 goals in 24 matches was made.

Third FBU qualifying round
The matches in the third qualifying round were originally scheduled to be played no later than 5 June 1963. 24 teams would play 12 qualifying matches, with 12 teams progressing to the third round.

Fourth FBU qualifying round
The qualifying matches in the fourth round were scheduled to be played before 23 June 1963. The four lowest seeded teams from the 1963 Funen Series made their entry for the first time in this round, all playing away matches.

Fifth FBU qualifying round
The fifth and final qualifying round under the Funen FA (FBU) consisted of 7 matches between two Kvalifikationsturneringen teams, six Funen Series teams, four FBUs Serie 1 teams and two FBUs Serie 2 teams. The matches were originally scheduled to be played before 30 June 1963. The four remaining highest seeded teams from the 1963 Funen Series made their entry, joining the 8 teams from the fourth qualifying round.

Jutland FA
A total number of 390 teams were registered for the regional qualifying rounds under the auspices of the Jutland FA, an additional 35 teams compared with the last season, the largest number of regional clubs in history. Only 16 teams will move on to the first round proper. More than 360 cup matches were played in the qualifying rounds governed by Jutland FA. The following 16 teams progressed to the first round proper: Silkeborg IF, Vorup Frederiksberg BK, Brande IF, Hjørring IF, IK Aalborg Freja, Esbjerg KFUM, Viby IF, BK Herning Fremad, Taars-Ugilt IF, Hobro IK, Thisted IK, Varde GF, Vejen SF, Borup FF, Bjerringbro IF and Hadsund BK.

First JBU qualifying round
In the weekend of 4–5 May, there was a break in the league tournament's match schedules for the Jutland FA's Series 1, 2, 3 and 4 as the initial couple of first qualifying round fixtures took place – only a match in the 1963 Jutland Series and previously canceled senior league matches were scheduled. The first qualifying round had 179 fixtures involving 32 teams from JBU's Serie 1, 67 teams from JBU's Serie 2, 125 teams from JBU's Serie 3 and 135 teams from JBU's Serie 4, which had been found by drawing lots at Jutlands FA's office. In 68 fixtures, teams from the same league played each other (4 teams in JBU's Serie 2, 24 teams in JBU's Serie 3, 40 teams JBU's Serie 4 and no teams from JBU's Serie 1).

Second JBU qualifying round
The Jutland FA made the draws for the second qualifying round after the conclusion of the first qualifying round, and involved 89 fixtures. The matches in the first qualifying round were played in the second half of May 1963. The second qualifying round had 89 fixtures involving 26 teams from JBU's Serie 1, 48 teams from JBU's Serie 2, 64 teams from JBU's Serie 3 and 43 teams from JBU's Serie 4.

Third JBU qualifying round
The matches in the third qualifying round were scheduled to be played in June 1963.

Fourth JBU qualifying round
The draw for the fourth qualifying regional round was held by the Jutland FA on 13 June 1963. The matches were originally scheduled to be played on 23 June 1963. 14 clubs from the JBUs Serie 1, 16 teams from the JBUs Serie 2, 13 clubs from the JBUs Serie 3 and one team from JBUs Serie 4 progressed to the fourth regional round. The four Jutland FA member clubs of the 1963 Kvalifikationsturneringen and all of the clubs from the 1963 Jutland Series entered the cup tournament for the first time.

Other JBU matches

Fifth JBU qualifying round
The 16 fixtures in the fifth and last qualifying round under the Jutland FA were originally scheduled to be played on 30 June 1963. The draw was made after the last match of the fourth qualifying round.

Lolland-Falster FA
Three teams, Holeby IF, Nakskov BK and B 1921, would progress to the first round proper from the regional qualifying rounds handled by the Lolland-Falster FA. The draw for the first qualifying round was held on 24 May by the Lolland-Falster FA. The fixtures for the next two rounds were also predetermined by the draw.

First LFBU qualifying round
The Lolland-Falster FA member club, Nakskov BK, from the 1963 Kvalifikationsturneringen, all seven first senior clubs from the 1963 Lolland-Falster Series and fourteen teams from the 1963 FBUs Mellemrække (all teams from the west and east groups, with the exception of Nørre Alslev BK, participated) entered the cup tournament in the first qualifying round. Two teams, Søllested IF and Rødby BK received a bye to the third qualifying round.

Second LFBU qualifying round
The majority of the six games in the second qualifying round were played on 19 June, while two games were scheduled for 20 June.

Third LFBU qualifying round
The 3 fixtures for the third and last qualifying round, governed by the Lolland-Falster FA, were played on 26 and 27 June 1963.

Zealand FA
A total number of 116 teams participated in the qualifying rounds governed by the Zealand FA. Only nine teams will move on to the first round proper, that would be handled by the Danish FA. All the qualifying rounds governed by the Zealand FA were played within the span of a month, from 22 May until 20 June 1963. Clubs playing in the 1963 season of SBUs Serie 1, SBUs Serie 2 and SBUs Serie 3 took part in the initial round. The teams in the SBUs Serie 4 and SBUs Serie 5 did not participate, with teams in SBUs Serie 3 only playing in their own closed cup tournament (SBUs Pokalturnering for serie 4 hold).

First SBU qualifying round
The draw by the Zealand FA for the fixtures in the first and second qualifying round took place on 20 May 1963. The majority of the 45 matches in the first qualifying round under the auspices of the Zealand FA were played on 23 May 1963, on the same day as the 1963 Danish Cup Final, with four fixtures taking place the day before. A total of 15 teams from these three lower ranking leagues received a bye to the second qualifying round.

Second SBU qualifying round
The draw by the Zealand FA for the fixtures in the first and second qualifying round also took place on 20 May 1963. All twelve teams from the 1963 Zealand Series and Zealand FA members, Helsingør IF and Kalundborg GF&BK, of the 1963 Kvalifikationsturneringen entered the cup tournament for the first time, with the majority of the 36 fixtures being scheduled for 5 June 1963 (Constitution Day). All clubs from the Zealand Series and Kvalifikationsturneringen played at their home ground, while the other club's fixtures was decided whether the club's first-round games was at home or away, drawing lots if the teams had both won an away or home game in the first round.

Third SBU qualifying round
The majority of the 18 fixtures were scheduled for 13 June 1963.

Fourth SBU qualifying round
The 9 fixtures were played on 19 and 20 June 1963.

Competition proper

Winners from each of the last qualifying rounds of the six regions advance to First Round Proper, where clubs from level 3 of Danish football, the Danmarksturneringens 3. division, first enter the competition.

Footnotes

References

1963-64
1963–64 domestic association football cups
1963–64 in Danish football